A referendum on restricting the veto power of the governor was held in American Samoa on 7 November 1990. The proposal was rejected by 75% of voters.

Results

References

Referendums in American Samoa
1990 in American Samoa
1990 referendums